Mohan Raj Malla (died 27 May 2021) was a Nepalese politician and the first Governor of Sudurpashchim Province. He was appointed Governor, as per the Article 163 (2) of the Constitution of Nepal by the President Bidya Devi Bhandari on the recommendation of the Council of Ministers of the Government of Nepal on 19 January 2019. He was also former village assembly chief and national assembly member of the Panchayat regime.

Political Life
He started his political life when he was 21 years old. He served as a member of Rastriya Panchayat for nine years from 1980 to 1989. He was a village chief in Doti for a term and served as the Kailali district assembly vice-president and Tikapur Development Committee chairperson during the Panchayat era. He was also an advisor to the foreign minister. Though he contested elections four times, he had lost. He was leader of Rastriya Prajatantra Party but joined the Nepali Congress before the  2013 Nepalese Constituent Assembly election.

Death
He passed away while undergoing treatment for COVID-19 at Nidan Hospital, in Lalitpur, on 27 May 2021. He was also suffering from pneumonia and heart problems.

See also
Governor (Nepal)
 Sudurpashchim Province

References

Year of birth missing
20th-century births
2021 deaths
People from Kailali District
Nepali Congress politicians from Sudurpashchim Province
Governors of Sudurpashchim Province
People from Doti District
Deaths from the COVID-19 pandemic in Nepal
Members of the Rastriya Panchayat